The Southern Indiana Screaming Eagles women's basketball team represents the University of Southern Indiana in Evansville, Indiana, United States. The Screaming Eagles currently compete in the NCAA Division I Ohio Valley Conference, having started a transition from Division II on July 1, 2022. Under NCAA rules for reclassifying programs, the Screaming Eagles will not be eligible to compete in the NCAA tournament until the 2026–27 season. The Screaming Eagles will be eligible to play in the WNIT, which unlike its men's counterpart is not operated by the NCAA.

The team is currently led by twenty-three-year head coach Rick Stein and play their home games at Screaming Eagles Arena.

See also
 Southern Indiana Screaming Eagles
 Southern Indiana Screaming Eagles men's basketball

References

External links
Website

College women's basketball teams in the United States